Ilex andicola is a species of tree in the family Aquifoliaceae. It is native to South America.

References

Trees of Peru
Trees of Bolivia
Trees of Ecuador
andicola